Aurelius Anicius Symmachus ( 415–420) was a politician of the Western Roman Empire belonging to the Roman families of the Anicii and of the Symmachi. In 415 he was proconsul of Africa and between 24 December 418 and January 420 he was praefectus urbi of Rome.

Biography 
He belonged to the Roman families of the Anicii and of the Symmachi; he was probably a relative of Quintus Aurelius Symmachus, perhaps the son of a brother or sister who had married a member of Anicii. In 415 he was proconsul of Africa; he obtained, in this capacity, the right to receive appeals.

Between 24 December 418 and January 420 he was praefectus urbi of Rome; in this capacity he wrote to the court regarding issues related to succession to Pope Zosimus, who had died two days after the beginning of Symmachus' office. He also restored a market in Ostia and one of the Roman forums.

Bibliography 
 Arnold Hugh Martin Jones, John Robert Martindale, John Morris, "Aurelius Anicius Symmachus 6", The Prosopography of the Later Roman Empire, Cambridge University Press, 1971, pp. 1043–1044.

Notes 

Anicii
Aurelii
Roman governors of Africa
Urban prefects of Rome
Year of death unknown
Year of birth unknown